Gyrodinium is a genus of dinoflagellates belonging to the order Gymnodiniales within class Dinophyceae.

The genus has cosmopolitan distribution. World Register of Marine Species lists 141 species, with many synonyms. 

They are heterotrophic (cannot produce its own food) and feed on diatoms (such as Chaetoceros debilis) that can be up to 12 times their length. They are 'naked' dinoflagellates, meaning they lack armor (or cellulosic plates).

Species

54 species, as accepted by the GBIF:

Gyrodinium aciculatum
Gyrodinium ascendans
Gyrodinium aureum 
Gyrodinium britannicum 
Gyrodinium calyptoglyphe 
Gyrodinium calyptroglyphe
Gyrodinium capsulatum
Gyrodinium carteretensis
Gyrodinium caudatum 
Gyrodinium citrinum
Gyrodinium cochlea 
Gyrodinium complanatum
Gyrodinium corallinum 
Gyrodinium crassum 
Gyrodinium dominans 
Gyrodinium estuariale 
Gyrodinium falcatum 
Gyrodinium ferrugineum
Gyrodinium flagellare 
Gyrodinium flavum
Gyrodinium formosum
Gyrodinium fusiforme 
Gyrodinium fusus 
Gyrodinium glaebum
Gyrodinium grave 
Gyrodinium grossestriatum
Gyrodinium helveticum 
Gyrodinium herbaceum 
Gyrodinium hyalinum 
Gyrodinium instriatum 
Gyrodinium katodiniaescens
Gyrodinium lachryma 
Gyrodinium lacryna
Gyrodinium lebourae
Gyrodinium lingulifera 
Gyrodinium longum 
Gyrodinium metum
Gyrodinium mundulum
Gyrodinium nasutum 
Gyrodinium ochraceum 
Gyrodinium pellucidum 
Gyrodinium pepo 
Gyrodinium pingue 
Gyrodinium prunus 
Gyrodinium pulchellum
Gyrodinium pusillum 
Gyrodinium resplendens 
Gyrodinium spirale 
Gyrodinium stratissimum
Gyrodinium submarinum 
Gyrodinium uncatenatum 
Gyrodinium undulans 
Gyrodinium varians 
Gyrodinium wulffii

References

Dinophyceae
Dinoflagellate genera